Raja Muhammad Akbar Khan was a landlord and a politician from Jhelum during British rule in India. He was the twenty eighth Raja of Bhimber. He was elected for the first time in 1920 in thirty eight member Punjab legislative council from Jhelum.

References

People from Jhelum
People from British India
Year of birth missing
Punjabi politicians
Indian landlords